Ramgarh Ke Sholay is a 1991 Indian Hindi-language parody film directed by Ajit Diwani, starring Vijay Saxena, Kishore Bhanushali and Amjad Khan. The film parodies the 1975 Bollywood film Sholay.

Amjad Khan, who played the iconic villain Gabbar Singh in the original, reprises his role in the film. The film also features lookalike actors Vijay Saxena, who resembles Amitabh Bachchan (who played Jai in the original Sholay), Kishore Bhanushali, who resembles Dev Anand as well as lookalike actors of Anil Kapoor and Govinda.

Cast
 Vijay Saxena as Vijay (Amitabh Bachchan)
 Kishore Bhanushali as Johny (Dev Anand)
 Amjad Khan as Gabbar Singh
 Anand Kumar as Anil Kapoor
 Navin Rathod as Govinda
 Dinesh Hingoo, as Dinesh Chandani
 Prashant Narayanan Manmauji as Havaldar Dhandakar – Bombay
 Mehmood Junior as Ghanshyam "Ghanu" "Ghaniya"
 Rajendra Nath as Inspector Ghanekar – Bombay
 Harish Patel as Inspector Himmat Singh
 Nargis as Jaiwanti Gabbar Singh's daughter

Soundtrack
The soundtrack for the film was composed by Anu Malik and was released on Venus Records & Tapes. The soundtrack features hit songs such as "Dosti Dosti" and "Teri Zulfein Shaam Si Roshan".

References

External links 
 

Sholay
1991 films
Indian parody films
1990s Hindi-language films
Films scored by Anu Malik
Cultural depictions of Amitabh Bachchan